Sunday River is a ski resort located in Newry, Maine, in the United States. It is one of Maine's largest and most visited ski resorts. Sunday River has the most terrain among the East Coast skiing destinations, including eight different peaks. The resort features 135 trails across eight interconnected mountain peaks, and is serviced by a network of 18 lifts.

Sunday River and its sister resort Sugarloaf have been operated by Boyne Resorts since being sold by American Skiing Company in 2007 for a combined $77 million. The resort's land has been owned by CNL Lifestyle, then Och-Ziff Capital Management, and leased back to Boyne.

In 2018, Boyne Resorts completed the purchase of all leased ski areas in New England from CNL Lifestyle, allowing Boyne to "accelerate and fine tune" investment in those areas (Loon, Sugarloaf, and Sunday River). In direct correlation with this event, Boyne announced a list of improvements for all three mountains, to be spread out over a span of 10 years.

Vertical descent 
Vertical Descent of the mountain, as well as the vertical descent from the chairlifts.

Total Vertical: 2,340 ft.
White Cap: 1,630 ft.
Locke Mountain: 1,460 ft.
Barker Mountain: 1,400 ft.
Spruce Peak: 1,500 ft.
North Peak: 1,000 ft.
South Ridge: 500 ft.
Aurora Peak: 1,100 ft.
Oz: 1,100 ft.
Jordan Bowl: 1,490 ft.

Terrain 

The following describes the different mountains of Sunday River (From left to right):
White Cap: Made up of three distinct chairlifts, The White Cap area offers terrain for all ability levels. Located at the eastern end of the resort, it contains beginner, advanced and expert runs, with multiple steeps and glades. White Heat is a well-known expert run, one of the steepest at Sunday River. White Heat is a main attraction, with Shock Wave on skiers right. Obsession is a long advanced to intermediate trail full of rolls and variation in pitch.
Locke Mountain: Locke Mountain is resort's original peak. Features predominantly advanced trails like Cascades, Monday Mourning and T2. The lower section of Locke is also home to Lift 5; a T-Bar going directly under the Locke triple for Gould Academy to train on lower Monday Mourning. Monday Mourning and the race arena parallel to it host a variety of alpine ski races.
Barker Mountain: Features a high-speed quad serving a variety of terrain. Three Mile Trail is a beginner run that winds across the mountain. Ecstasy and Right Stuff are other important trails leading over to T2 and White Cap. Also under the Barker Lift is Sunday Punch and the Flow State boardercross course.
Spruce Peak: Contains two intermediate trails, Risky Business and American Express.  Downdraft is a short and steep run that often contains natural mogul skiing. The peak also offers quick access to the western side of the resort via Sirius. Spruce peak is located in the center of the mountain is the only fixed grip lift to have a loading conveyor.
South Ridge: South Ridge services mainly beginner trails. Broadway, and Sundance are the most kid-friendly, with Mixing Bowl also being a popular natural trail for beginners. The South Ridge area also has 3 magic carpets, a high speed quad, and a Chondola lift (high speed six-pack + 8-person gondolas).
North Peak: Has a mid-mountain lodge that offers food and beverages. Contains two high-speed chairlifts (Lift #6 and #7) that both terminate near the summit. North Peak is oriented toward "family" skiing, so jerries and gapers are always plentiful. There are mainly intermediate and beginner trails on North Peak. The Dream Maker trail is a long and wide beginner to intermediate trail that is a favorite for families. North Peak is also home to the terrain parks on 3D, and T72, some of Maine's biggest parks. During weekends and holidays, North peak offers night skiing on both Escapade and Dream Maker, that are both serviced by the Chondola.
Aurora Peak: Aurora is mix of advanced and expert trails, all serviced by a quad chairlift. There is also a double chairlift (Lift 13) that connects the base of Aurora to the base of Jordan Bowl, and a triple chairlift (Lift #3) that connects Aurora basin to North Peak. 
OZ: A unique bowl with mainly advanced and expert terrain. Trails are a mix of glades and open trails that emphasize natural terrain features and steep pitches. The Oz quad (Lift #15) only operates on the weekends and holidays due to its difficulty and light snow cover.
Jordan Bowl: Serviced by the Jordan 8 chairlift, Jordan Bowl contains a mix of terrain that covers all ability levels. Rogue Angel and Excalibur are two long intermeidate trails, and Lollapalooza is the longest trail on the mountain. Kansas is a long connector trail that can bring you across all of the eight peaks from the summit of Jordan Bowl. The Jordan Hotel is also located off the beginner trail Lollapalooza. Other advanced / expert glades include iCaramba!, Wizards Gulch, and Blind Ambition. 
Merrill Hill: Services 3 beginner trails, and 1 intermediate trail. This complex was constructed primarily for a real estate development that started in 2020. 

Out of these "peaks," only one actually has a topographic prominence great enough to be an actual peak. White Cap, Locke Mountain, and Barker Mountain are, technically, all part of a mountain called Barker Mountain. Barker Mountain's peak (el. ), inaccurately, is the peak that the ski area calls "Locke Mountain." North Peak, Spruce Peak, Aurora Peak, OZ, and Jordan Bowl are technically all part of Black Mountain (el. ). The highest point of the ski area is what the resort calls OZ, which is technically on Black Mountain (el. ). Although OZ is the highest point of the Sunday River ski area, it is not Black Mountain's summit.

Lift System

Sunday River has 16 chairlifts, and 3 surface lifts.

Main Lifts

 highlight indicates lifts that are open for night skiing. 

 highlight indicates secondary lifts that only run on weekends and holidays, with adjusted opening and closing schedules.

Former Lifts

Summer 

In the summer months, Sunday River is a summer resort with activities including golf, disk golf, geocache tours, hiking, and scenic lift rides. There is also a series of annual music festivals from late July to August, located at the south ridge lodge. Weddings are also a frequent occurrence at Sunday River, mostly at the summit of North Peak, but also the Grand Summit and the Jordan Hotels.

In 2019, the Bike Park at Sunday River was discontinued, after 13 years of operation. According to resort officials, "Topography and other factors contributed to the decision to close. Riding areas and lessons for beginner riders are a large part of a successful bike park and Sunday River was unable to provide this to their resort users without a substantial monetary investment."

Golf
The Sunday River Golf Club is a Robert Trent Jones, Jr. design and has been ranked as the '#1 course in Maine' by Golfweek magazine and one of the 'Top Ten Best New Courses in the World' by Travel + Leisure Golf.

The  course offers dramatic elevation changes. The club also features a large log and stone clubhouse with a pro shop and grille, as well as a mountainside practice facility.  While the course is open to the public, memberships are also available from Harris Golf, who operates the golf club in partnership with Sunday River.

Gallery

Competition
Sunday River is home to the Gould Academy Competition Program for skiing.  The program is for junior skiers in Alpine skiing (slalom, giant slalom, super G and downhill), Freestyle skiing (moguls and freeride), and Snowboarding (halfpipe, slopestyle, Slalom, Giant Slalom and boardercross), and runs from mid November through March.

Sunday River is home to the Dumont Cup created by Simon Dumont.

Dumont Cup
In 2009, Simon Dumont wanted to create an opportunity for young and rising skiers to gain exposure and decided to host it at his home mountain, Sunday River in Newry, Maine. Six Dumont Cups later, the success stories of amateur skiers like Nick Geopper and Gus Kenworthy winning the Dumont Cup and stepping into the pro scene has help achieve Simon's vision. The event was eventually officially discontinued in 2016, and the last competition held in March 2015 on the T72 terrain park.

Frozen Rush

In early 2014, the first Frozen Rush race was held on the slopes. It was the first off-road race of its type on snow. The event featured a match race of the United States' top short course off-road racing drivers racing their trophy trucks. Ricky Johnson beat Johnny Greaves to win the inaugural event.

See also
Sunday River Ski Train

References

External links 

 Sunday River - official website

Buildings and structures in Oxford County, Maine
Ski areas and resorts in Maine
Tourist attractions in Oxford County, Maine
Newry, Maine